Townsend Township may refer to the following places:

In Canada

Townsend Township, Ontario (historical, in Norfolk County)

In the United States

Townsend Township, Huron County, Ohio
Townsend Township, Sandusky County, Ohio

See also

Townsend (disambiguation)

Township name disambiguation pages